Bilel Aït Malek (born 19 August 1996) is a French-Tunisian footballer who plays as a midfielder for Stade Tunisien.

Career

Vereya
On 1 August 2018, Malek signed a contract with Bulgarian club FC Vereya.

Sportul Snagov
On 20 February 2019, Bilel signed a contract with the Romanian Liga II leader, CS Sportul Snagov.

References

External links
 

1996 births
Living people
Sportspeople from Saint-Denis, Seine-Saint-Denis
French footballers
Association football midfielders
Championnat National players
First Professional Football League (Bulgaria) players
Liga II players
Tunisian Ligue Professionnelle 1 players
RC Lens players
Tarbes Pyrénées Football players
FC Vereya players
CS Sportul Snagov players
Stade Tunisien players
French expatriate footballers
French expatriate sportspeople in Bulgaria
Expatriate footballers in Bulgaria
French expatriate sportspeople in Romania
Expatriate footballers in Romania
Footballers from Seine-Saint-Denis